The England team disputed several umpiring decisions in the 1970–71 Ashes series, Ray Illingworth, Geoffrey Boycott and John Snow in particular. After the series Boycott and Snow were called to a disciplinary hearing at Lords over their behaviour, and Illingworth and Snow never toured again. Only three umpires were used; Lou Rowan, who was most involved in the controversy, and his colleagues Tom Brooks and Max O'Connell who both debuted as Test umpires in the series. At the time, umpires had no recourse to slow motion replays and had to make decisions based on what they saw in a split second, with the benefit of the doubt always going to the batsman. As a result it was not uncommon for umpires to make mistakes, which over the course of a long series tended to cancel each other out. The best an umpire could do was to make an honest judgement based on what he saw.

Lou Rowan was a policeman and became senior umpire after the retirement of the much respected Col Egar. He was inclined to stand on his authority and retired at the end of the series. In 1972 he wrote The Umpire's Story which was highly critical of the England team, particularly of Illingworth and Snow. It even queried "was John Snow actually grabbed by a spectator who objected to Snow flattening an Australian batsman?". regardless of photographic evidence to the contrary. John Snow in his autobiography Cricket Rebel devoted a whole chapter to "Bitter Rows with Umpire Rowan" in which he wrote 'I have never come across another umpire so full of his own importance, so stubborn, lacking in humour, unreasonable and utterly unable'. E.W. Swanton was not convinced that the umpires were biased "...the old hobby horse trotted out of the alleged incompetence of Australian umpires. There were ructions ahead, of course, but my view was that Rowan, Tom Brooks and M.G. O'Connell, who shared the umpiring in the series, did a good job all through."

In the Second Test Ray Illingworth was put in to bat, but Rowan refused his request for the roller to be used on the wicket before play began. Rowan later realised his mistake and apologised in the lunch break. Even John Snow applauded when he and Tom Brooks refused to start play at Melbourne in the abandoned Third Test. Ian Johnson and the Melbourne authorities were desperate to get the game going, but the umpires refused to be pressured as the field was quite unfit for play. Snow found Max O'Connell 'a very reasonable and fair man, even if I did not agree with him' and that they could talk problems through. Brooks was the only one of the umpires who had played First Class Cricket – he had been a lively fast-medium bowler – and as a result was more able to connect with the Test players, and was more forgiving of short-pitched deliveries which he saw as a natural part of the game.

Intimidatory bowling
John Snow wrote that Lou Rowan was 'utterly unable to distinguish between a delivery short of a length which rise around the height of the rib cage and a genuine bouncer which goes through head high'. and believed that chest high balls were not intimidatory. However, English umpire Dickie Bird wrote "as far as I am concerned, intimidatory bowling is the fast, short pitched ball into the region of the batsman's ribcage. When such a ball is fired in it is then that I feel an umpire must be firm...and tell the bowler to cut it out...that's the killer ball, and that is when I always step in". As Snow hit tailenders Garth McKenzie and Terry Jenner on the head in the series and continually bowled short at the other Australian batsmen it was not unreasonable for the umpires to intervene. Snow thought this was partisanship as Alan Thomson was not called to book when he bowled bouncers at Snow and six in one eight-ball over against Ray Illingworth.

Snow was twice warned by Rowan for intimidatory bowling in the Second Test at Perth, but he refused to accept that rib high balls were intimidatory and continued to bowl them. As a result Snow was given an official warning, which meant that he would not be allowed to bowl if he was warned again. Illingworth told him that this was to be his last over in any case and the fast bowler sent his last ball flying over the head of Doug Walters, turned to Rowan and said "Now that's a bouncer for you". In the Seventh Test Rowan warned Snow again when he hit tailender Terry Jenner on the head with a short ball, but waited until after Jenner had been helped off and Snow was walking back to his mark instead of having a quiet word in the interim. Snow thought this inflamed the crowd who had just calmed down after the incident itself. When they started throwing beer-cans and food onto the ground Illingworth took his team back to the dressing room when the umpires refused to do so, an unprecedented move in Test cricket.

Run outs
There were two run out incidents. In the First Test Keith Stackpole should have been run out for 18 as Geoff Boycott threw down the wicket at the bowler's end, but the batsman was given the benefit of the doubt by Lou Rowan. The Australian papers carried photographs the next day showing that he was clearly out and labelled the decision "one of the worst in cricket history". It probably cost England victory as Stackpole made 207 – his highest Test score – and if the "extra" 189 runs are subtracted England would have won by an innings (464 to Australia's 244 & 214). Rowan's refusal to accept that his decision was wrong gave the England players grave doubts as to his ability and led them to question his judgements for the remainder of the series. Boycott was particularly upset with the decision, but in the Sixth Test he was even angrier when Umpire O'Connell gave him out. Ian Chappell had thrown down the stumps as Boycott failed to ground his bat finishing a run. He vocally disputed his dismissal and later pointedly refused to apologise for his behaviour, which led to another press furore especially as a photograph showed that he was clearly out. Boycott later apologised to Umpire O'Connell in private.

Catches and stumpings
In the Fifth Test Max O'Connell called "over" and turned to walk to square leg after Snow bowled the last ball of the first over. As a result he missed Alan Knott catching Keith Stackpole and had to give him not out. This was his first over as an umpire in Test cricket and Snow 'could quite understand his actions which illustrate the pressure umpires are also under in a Test', and they were able to joke about it afterwards. In the Seventh Test Walters had to be stumped twice by Knott off Underwood as he was given not out by Rowan the first time when for 41, but was a few balls later by Max O'Connell on 42. Later in the match Keith Stackpole was caught off a thick edge by Alan Knott off Peter Lever on 13, but was given not out by Rowan, Illingworth said the decision "was really unbelievable".

Leg before wicket
No Australian batsman was given out leg before wicket in the entire series, the clearest evidence of umpiring bias in the minds of the England players. Again Keith Stackpole benefited, in the Second Test he survived lbw appeals from Ken Shuttleworth and Peter Lever before he was out caught by Lever off Snow for 8. There was an experimental lbw law in force at the time which made it more difficult to dismiss batsmen, particularly for spin bowlers. In any case five England batsmen were given out lbw in the series.

References

Bibliography
 Dickie Bird with Keuth Lodge, My Autobiography, Hodder & Stoughton, 1997
 Criss Freddi, The Guinness Book of Cricket Blunders, Guinness Publishing, 1996
 John Snow, Cricket Rebel: An Autobiography, Littlehampton Book Services Ltd, 1976
 E.W. Swanton, Swanton in Australia with MCC 1946-75, Fontant, 1977

Annual reviews
 Playfair Cricket Annual 1971
 Wisden Cricketers' Almanack 1971

Further reading
 Geoffrey Boycott, Boycott: The Autobiography, Pan Books, 2006
 Ashley Brown, A Pictorial History of Cricket, Bison Books Ltd, 1988
 Mark Browning, Rod Marsh: A Life in Cricket, Rosenberg Publishing, 2003
 Ian Brayshaw, The Chappell Era, ABC Enterprises, 1984
 Greg Chappell, Old Hands Showed The Way, Test Series Official Book 1986-87, The Clashes For The Ashes, Australia vs England, Playbill Sport Publication, 1986
 Ian Chappell, Austin Robertson and Paul Rigby, Chappelli Has the Last Laugh, Lansdowne Press, 1980
 Ian Chappell and Ashley Mallett, Hitting Out: The Ian Chappell Story, Orion, 2006
 Chris Cowdrey and Jonathan Smith, Good Enough, Pelham Books, 1986
 Colin Cowdrey, M. C. C. The Autobiography of a Cricketer, Coronet Books, 1977
 Basil d'Oliveira, Time to Declare: An Autobiography, Star, 1982
 Basil d'Oliveira, Basil d'Oliveira: Cricket and Controversy, Sphere, 2005
 Bill Frindall, The Wisden Book of Test Cricket 1877-1978, Wisden, 1979
 Colin Firth, Pageant of Cricket, The MacMillan Company of Australia,1987
 David Gower, Heroes and Contemporaries, Granada Publishing Ltd, 1985
 Tom Graveney and Norman Miller, The Ten Greatest Test Teams, Sidgewick and Jackson, 1988
 Chris Harte, A History of Australian Cricket, Andre Deutsch, 1993
 Ed Jaggard, Garth: The Story of Graham McKenzie, Fremantle Arts Centre Press, 1993
 Ken Kelly and David Lemmon, Cricket Reflections: Five Decades of Cricket Photographs, Heinemann, 1985
 Dennis Lillee, Lillee, My Life in Cricket, Methuen Australia, 1982
 Dennis Lillee, Menace: the Autobiography, Headline Book Publishing, 2003
 Brian Luckhurst and Mike Baldwin, Boot Boy to President, KOS Media, 2004
 Ashley Mallett, Rowdy, Lynton Publications, 1973
 Ashley Mallett, Spin Out, Garry Sparke & Associates, 1977
 Ashley Mallett, One Of A Kind: The Doug Walters Story, Orion, 2009
 Rod Marsh, The Gloves of Irony, Pan, 1999
 Adrian McGregor, Greg Chappell, Collins, 1985
 Mark Peel, The Last Roman: A Biography of Colin Cowdrey, Andre Deutsch Ltd, 1999
 Ray Robinson, On Top Down Under, Cassell, 1975
 Lou Rowan, The Umpires Story with an Analysis of the laws of cricket, Jack Pollard, 1972
 Keith Stackpole and Alan Trenglove, Not Just For Openers, Stockwell Press, 1974
 Mike Stevenson, Illy: A Biography Of Ray Illingworth, Midas Books, 1978
 Peter Arnold, The Illustrated Encyclopaedia of World of Cricket, W.H. Smith, 1985
 E.W. Swanton (ed), The Barclays World of Cricket, Collins, 1986
 Derek Underwood, Beating the Bat: An Autobiography, S.Paul, 1975
 Bob Willis, Lasting the Pace, Collins, 1985

Video
 Allan Border and David Gower, The Best Of The Ashes - 1970 - 1987, 2 Entertain Video, 1991

DVD
 David Steele, England Cricket Six of the Best: The Seventies, A Sharpe Focus Production for Green Umbrella, 2009 (showing England's 299 run victory in the Fourth Test at Sydney in 1970-71)

External links
 CricketArchive tour itinerary

1970 in Australian cricket
1970 in English cricket
1971 in Australian cricket
1971 in English cricket
1970
Cricket umpiring